Chadd Collins is an Australian Muay Thai fighter. He is the current WBC Muaythai World Lightweight champion. As of January 2023, he is the #7 ranked featherweight kickboxer in the world according to Beyond Kick.

Muay Thai career
Collins was scheduled to fight Parviz Iskenderov for the WKN Australia title, during the Nemesis XI event. He defeated Iskenderov by decision.

Over the course of the next three years, before his WBC Muaythai and WMC title challenges, Collins achieved notable victories over the two weight Lumpini Stadium champion Pongsiri P.K.Saenchaimuaythaigym, Kaito Ono and the former RISE and REBELS champion Fukashi Mizutani.

In June 2019, Collins fought Luis Cajaiba for the vacant WBC Muaythai Super Welterweight title. Cajaiba won the fight by decision.

In September 2019, Collins challenged Satanfah Rachanon for the WBC Muay Thai World World Welterweight title. He lost the fight by decision. He bounced back with a decision win over Avatar Tor Morsri during MX MUAY XTREME.

He fought Bobo Sacko for the vacant WMC World Welterweight title in December 2019. Sacko won the fight by decision.

Titles and accomplishments
World Kickboxing Network
 2016 WKN Australia Champion

World Muay Thai Council
 2022 WMC International Super Lightweight Champion

World Boxing Council Muay Thai
 2022 WBC Muay Thai World -63.5kg Champion

Fight record

|-  style="background:#;"
| 2023-03-25|| ||align=left| Fah Likit Lukmahathat || Infliction Fight Series || Carrara, Queensland, Australia ||   ||  || 
|-
! style=background:white colspan=9 |
|-  style="background:#cfc;"
| 2022-12-25|| Win ||align=left| Hiroki Kasahara || RISE World Series - Glory Rivals 4|| Tokyo, Japan || Decision (Unanimous) || 3|| 3:00
|-
|-  style="background:#cfc;"
| 2022-11-26|| Win||align=left| Yod-IQ Sor.Thanaphet || Rebellion Muay Thai XXVII || Melbourne, Australia || Decision (Unanimous) || 5 || 3:00 
|-
! style=background:white colspan=9 |
|-  style="text-align:center; background:#cfc"
| 2022-10-15 || Win ||align=left| Naoki|| RISE World Series 2022 || Tokyo, Japan || KO (Punches)|| 2||1:42
|-
|-  style="text-align:center; background:#cfc"
| 2022-08-21 || Win ||align=left| Ryota Nakano || RISE WORLD SERIES 2022 Osaka || Osaka, Japan || KO (Punches)|| 1 || 2:43

|-  style="background:#CCFFCC;"
| 2022-07-16 || Win||align=left| Luktum WinnerMuaythai || Infliction Fight Series || Gold Coast, Queensland, Australia || Decision (Unanimous) || 5||3:00
|-
! style=background:white colspan=9 |
|- style="background:#fbb"
| 2022-05-28 || Loss||align=left|  Jack SorKor.NidKlongsamwa || Fairtex Fight, Lumpinee Stadium|| Bangkok, Thailand || Decision || 3 ||3:00
|-  style="background:#CCFFCC;"
| 2021-11-27|| Win||align=left| Quinton Smith || The Road To Retribution || Gold Coast, Queensland, Australia || Decision || 5||3:00
|-
! style=background:white colspan=9 |
|-  style="background:#CCFFCC;"
| 2021-10-30|| Win||align=left| Rhys Karakyriacos || Infliction Muay Thai || Sydney, Australia || Decision || 3||3:00
|-  style="background:#CCFFCC;"
| 2021-07-17|| Win||align=left| Ramesh Habib || Infliction Muay Thai || Queensland, Australia || TKO (Doctor Stoppage) || 3 ||
|-  style="background:#FFBBBB;"
| 2019-12-14|| Loss||align=left| Bobo Sacko ||  Golden Fight || Paris, France || Decision || 5 || 3:00
|-
! style=background:white colspan=9 |
|-  style="background:#CCFFCC;"
| 2019-10-27|| Win||align=left| Avatar Tor.Morsri || MX MUAY XTREME || Bangkok, Thailand || Decision || 3 || 3:00
|-  style="background:#FFBBBB;"
| 2019-09-09|| Loss||align=left| Satanfah Rachanon ||  Lumpinee Stadium || Bangkok, Thailand || Decision || 5 || 3:00
|-
! style=background:white colspan=9 |
|-  style="background:#FFBBBB;"
| 2019-06-18|| Loss||align=left| Luis Cajaiba || Petchnumnoi + Prestige Fight Lumpinee Stadium || Bangkok, Thailand || Decision || 5 || 3:00
|-
! style=background:white colspan=9 |
|-  bgcolor="#CCFFCC"
| 2019-04-27 || Win|| align=left| Kaito || SHOOT BOXING 2019 act.2 || Tokyo, Japan || Decision (Unanimous)|| 5 || 3:00
|-  bgcolor="#CCFFCC"
| 2019-02-11|| Win||align=left| Fukashi || KNOCK OUT 2019 WINTER THE ANSWER IS IN THE RING || Tokyo, Japan || Decision (Unanimous) || 5 || 3:00
|-  bgcolor="#c5d2ea"
| 2018-12-01 || Draw|| align=left| Azize Hlali || Credissimo Golden Fight || Levallois Perret, France || Decision || 5 || 3:00
|-  bgcolor="#CCFFCC"
| 2018-10-28 || Win|| align=left| Pongsiri P.K.Saenchaimuaythaigym || Topking World Series || Ratchaburi province, Thailand || Decision || 3 || 3:00
|-  bgcolor="#FFBBBB"
| 2018-09-27 || Loss|| align=left| Phonek Or.Kwanmuang || Sor. Sommai Rajadamnern Stadium || Bangkok, Thailand || Decision || 5 || 3:00
|-  bgcolor="#CCFFCC"
| 2018-08-23 || Win|| align=left| Sakmongkol Sor. Sommai ||  Rajadamnern Stadium || Bangkok, Thailand || KO (Uppercut) || 3 ||
|-  bgcolor="#FFBBBB"
| 2018-07-25 || Loss|| align=left| Phonek Or.Kwanmuang ||  Rajadamnern Stadium || Bangkok, Thailand || Decision || 5 || 3:00
|-  bgcolor="#CCFFCC"
| 2017-09-11 || Win|| align=left| Sakmongkol Sor.Sommai ||  Rajadamnern Stadium || Bangkok, Thailand || KO (Left elbow)|| 3 || 
|-  style="background:#CCFFCC;"
| 2017-08-07|| Win||align=left| Saeksan Or. Kwanmuang || Rajadamnern Stadium|| Bangkok, Thailand || Decision || 5 || 3:00
|-  style="background:#FFBBBB;"
| 2017-07-15|| Loss ||align=left| Saenchai || Thai Fight: We Love Yala || Yala province, Thailand || Decision || 3 || 3:00
|-  style="background:#FFBBBB;"
| 2017-04-29|| Loss ||align=left| Manasak Sitniwat|| THAI FIGHT Samui 2017 || Ko Samui, Thailand || Decision || 3 || 3:00
|-  style="background:#FFBBBB;"
| 2017-04-08|| Loss ||align=left| Talaytong Sor.Thanaphet || Lumpinee Stadium || Bangkok, Thailand || Decision || 5 || 3:00
|-  style="background:#CCFFCC;"
| 2017-02-17|| Win ||align=left| Lampard Sor Kamsing ||  MX MUAY XTREME  || Bangkok, Thailand || KO (Body punch) || 3 ||
|-  style="background:#CCFFCC;"
| 2016-12-23|| Win||align=left| Pakorn PKSaenchaimuaythaigym || MX MUAY XTREME || Bangkok, Thailand || Decision || 5 || 3:00
|-  style="background:#CCFFCC;"
| 2016-07-24|| Win||align=left| Petchmeechai Petchcharoen || MAX Muay Thai || Bangkok, Thailand || KO (High kick) || 2 ||
|-  style="background:#CCFFCC;"
| 2016-05-21|| Win||align=left| Parviz Iskenderov || Nemesis XI || Australia || Decision  || 5 || 3:00
|-
! style=background:white colspan=9 |
|-  style="background:#FFBBBB;"
| 2016-04-16|| Loss ||align=left| Samuel Bark|| Prestige Fight Series 3 || Moolap, Australia || Decision  || 5 || 3:00
|-  style="background:#CCFFCC;"
| 2015-10-31|| Win||align=left| Kurtis Staiti|| Destiny 5  || Mansfield, Australia || Decision  || 5 || 3:00
|-  style="background:#FFBBBB;"
| 2015-03-20|| Loss ||align=left| Roy Wills || Road To Rebellion IV  || Balaclava, Australia || Decision  || 5 || 3:00
|-  style="background:#CCFFCC;"
| 2014-10-03|| Win||align=left| Beniah Douma || Eruption 10  || Australia || Decision  || 5 || 3:00
|-  style="background:#CCFFCC;"
| 2014-01-05|| Win||align=left| Cartoon Sumalee || Sunday Championship Night  || Australia || TKO ||  ||
|-
| colspan=9 | Legend:    

|-  style="background:#fbb;"
| 2014-05- || Loss || align=left| Karl Axelsson || 2014 IFMA World Championships, 1/8 Finals || Langkawi, Malaysia || Decision || 3 || 3:00 
|-
| colspan=9 | Legend:

See also
List of male kickboxers

References

1995 births
Living people
Australian male kickboxers
People from South East Queensland
Australian Muay Thai practitioners
Sportsmen from Queensland